Chumley may refer to: 
Chumley Huffington, in Yu-Gi-Oh! GX
Chumley, a walrus from the animated series Tennessee Tuxedo and His Tales
Chumley, a troll from Robert Asprin's MythAdventures series
Dr. Chumley, in the play Harvey
Bernard Chumley, from the radio and TV sketch comedy show Little Britain
Donald Chumley (born 1962), American football player
Heidi Chumley, American primary care physician and academic administrator
Lyle Chumley, character in Under the Dome

See also
 Cholmondeley (disambiguation), pronounced the same
 Chulmleigh (disambiguation)
 Andrew Chumbley, English practitioner of magic and witchcraft
 Chumley's, a pub in New York City
 Chumlee (born Austin Lee Russell), a pawn shop employee on the TV show Pawn Stars
 Chun-Li, a player character from the Street Fighter fighting game franchise